A transcendental argument is a deductive philosophical argument which takes a manifest feature of experience as granted, and articulates what must be the case so that such experiences are possible. Transcendental arguments may have additional standards of justification that are more demanding than those of traditional deductive arguments.

The arguments
Typically, a transcendental argument starts from some accepted aspect of experience, and then deduces what must be true for that type of experience to be possible. Transcendental arguments are often used as arguments against skepticism, usually about the reality of the external world or other minds.

So-called progressive transcendental arguments begin with an apparently indubitable and universally accepted statement about people's experiences of the world, and use this to make substantive knowledge-claims about the world, e.g., that it is causally and spatiotemporally related. They start with what is left at the end of the skeptic's process of doubting.

Regressive transcendental arguments, on the other hand, begin at the same point as the skeptic, e.g., the fact that we have experience of a causal and spatiotemporal world, and show that certain notions are implicit in our conceptions of such experience. Regressive transcendental arguments are more conservative in that they do not purport to make substantive ontological claims about the world.

An example is used by Kant in his refutation of idealism. Idealists believe that the experience of objects independent of our mind is not legitimate. Briefly, Kant shows that

since idealists acknowledge that we have an inner mental life, and
an inner life of self-awareness is bound up with the concepts of objects which are not inner, and which interact causally,
then we must have legitimate experience of outer objects which interact causally.

He has not established that outer objects exist, but only that the concept of them is legitimate, contrary to idealism.

Not all use of transcendental arguments are intended to counter skepticism, however. The Dutch philosopher Herman Dooyeweerd used transcendental critique to establish the conditions that make a theoretical attitude of thought (not just the process of thinking, as in Kant) possible. In particular, he showed that theoretical thought cannot be neutral, rather, must be based on presuppositions that are "religious" in nature (in the sense of pre-theoretical commitment).

Kant

It was Immanuel Kant who gave transcendental arguments their name and notoriety. It is open to controversy, though, whether his own transcendental arguments should be classified as progressive or regressive.

In the Critique of Pure Reason (1781) Kant developed one of philosophy's most famous transcendental arguments in 'The Deduction of the Pure Concepts of the Understanding'. In the 'Transcendental Aesthetic', Kant used transcendental arguments to show that sensory experiences would not be possible if we did not impose their spatial and temporal forms on them, making space and time "conditions of the possibility of experience".

Criticisms of transcendental arguments

As stated above, one of the main uses of transcendental arguments is to use one thing we can know, the nature of our experiences, to counter skeptics' arguments that we cannot know something or other about the nature of the world. One need not be a skeptic about those matters, however, to find transcendental arguments unpersuasive. There are a number of ways that one might deny that a given transcendental argument gives us knowledge of the world. The following responses may suit some versions and not others.

First, critics respond by claiming that the arguer cannot be sure that he or she is having particular experiences. That a person cannot be sure about the nature of his or her own experiences may initially seem bizarre. However, it may be claimed that the very act of thinking about or, even more, describing our experiences in words, involves interpreting them in ways that go beyond so-called 'pure' experience.
Second, skeptics object to the use of transcendental arguments to draw conclusions about the nature of the world by claiming that even if a person does know the nature of his or her experiences, that person cannot know that the reasoning from these experiences to conclusions about the world is accurate.
Lastly, critics have debated whether showing that we must think of the world in a certain way, given certain features of experience, is tantamount to showing that the world answers to that conception. Perhaps transcendental arguments show only necessities of our cognitive apparatus rather than realities of the world apart from us. This objection may amount to throwing doubt on whether transcendental arguments are ever more than merely "regressive".

See also
Transcendental idealism
P.F. Strawson
John McDowell
Wilfrid Sellars

References

Bibliography
Brueckner, Anthony. " Transcendental Arguments I". Nous 17 (4): 551-575. and  "Transcendental Arguments II". Nous 18 (2): 197-225.
 Stapleford, Scott Kant's Transcendental Arguments: Disciplining Pure Reason - Continuum Publishing 2008 ( - hb)
 Stern, Robert, ed.Transcendental Arguments: Problems and Prospect.  Oxford: Clarendon.
 Stroud, Barry. "Transcendental Arguments". Journal of Philosophy 65 (1968) 241-56.
 Taylor, Charles. "The Validity of Transcendental Arguments". Reprinted in Philosophical Arguments. Cambridge, MA: Harvard University Press, 1955.

External links 
 
 
 
 

Philosophical arguments
Deductive reasoning
Philosophical methodology
German idealism